Stephen Koch (born May 8, 1941) is a novelist, essayist, historian and teacher. He has written numerous books of cultural history, two novels, and a classic study of the work of Andy Warhol. He has taught creative writing at both the undergraduate and graduate levels at Columbia University and Princeton University. He is also the author of a handbook for writers, The Modern Library Writer's Workshop.

Early life 
Koch was born in Saint Paul, Minnesota, though he spent his childhood in Northfield, Minnesota, a college town (Carleton and St. Olaf Colleges), where his father was a local lawyer. His father died in 1951, when Koch was ten, and he grew up in a middle-class home with his mother, Edith Koch; his brother, the physicist Frederick Koch, and his maternal grandmother, Emma Pilling Bayard, a classic daughter of midwestern pioneers, who died at an advanced age when Koch was 16.

After attendance in the local schools, where he his prime enthusiasm was the theater, Koch entered the University of Minnesota, studying comparative literature.  After one year, he moved to New York City, where he had dreamt of living since childhood. He earned his living in various menial positions at the New York Public Library, and more glamorously, as an assistant to the managing clerk of the prominent white-shoe law firm, Lord, Day, and Lord.

In 1960, Koch married for the first time, and in 1963 earned his BA at the City College of New York. At City College, he studied literature, not because he wished to become an academic, but because he hoped knowledge of literature would serve his ambition to be a writer.  At City College, he was awarded what he still regards as the greatest honor of his life, when he was named the most promising future law student in his graduating class. Nonetheless, because of his primary vocation to be a writer, he decided against law school, and instead pursued graduate studies at Columbia University.

Literary career 
Dissatisfied with graduate school, Koch began to write reviews and literary essays which, in 1965, came to the attention of the then-rising literary star, Susan Sontag, and he became for the next several years, Sontag's protégé. He dropped graduate study, and his criticism was regularly published in magazines such as the New Republic, Partisan Review, The Nation, Tri-Quarterly, The New York Times Book Review, and many others. In 1966, he became an instructor in the department of English at the State University of New York at Stony Brook. In 1969, he completed his first novel, Night Watch, which was published by Harper and Row to generally strong positive critical response both in print and the media.

In 1971, Koch became the writer and on-camera host of the ten-part PBS series on art: Eye-to-Eye. In the same year, he also wrote his book on the films of Andy Warhol, Stargazer, which has remained in print for over fifty years. After that, he became a regular contributor to various magazines, notably Harper's and Esquire, where during the first wave of feminism, he published a widely noticed essay The Guilty Sex. His relation with Harper’s Magazine ended when the editor refused to publish his enthusiastic essay about Robert Wilson and Philip Glass’ avant-garde opera “Einstein on the Beach.”

In 1977, despite his reluctance to become an academic, Koch became a fiction workshop leader at Columbia University’s MFA program in the School of the Arts. In 1978, he became an instructor in the undergraduate fiction writing program at Princeton University, where he continued to teach for seven years. He used his experience as a mentor to creative writers to produce the widely recognized handbook, The Modern Library Writer's Workshop. He remained at Columbia until 1991, by which time he had been, for several years, chairman of the program. A number of his former students at both universities have gone onto distinguished careers in literature and the theater.

In 1986, Koch published The Bachelor's Bride, a novel about the life and violent death of an art star of the 60s and 70s. By a strange fluke, in the last interview given before his death, Andy Warhol mentioned that he wanted to make a movie based on this novel.

In the late 1980s into the mid-1990s, Koch wrote about twentieth century cultural history and wrote books of nonfiction: Double Lives: Stalin, Willi Munzenberg and the Seduction of the Intellectuals and The Breaking Point: Hemingway, Dos Passos and the Murder of Jose Robles.  Later, because of his longstanding interest in the forces that lead to German fascism and the Second World War, he published Hitler’s Pawn: The Boy Assassin and the Holocaust, the story of the obscure Jewish teenager in Paris whose assassination of a German diplomat was used by Hitler for the initiating event of the Holocaust, the Kristalnacht.

Personal life 
Koch has been married twice: from 1960 to 1965, Sheila Shulman and from 1987 to the present, Frances Cohen, MD. Frances Cohen passed away 2021. He has one daughter, Angelica Madeline Koch, born in 1994. Koch is bisexual and has had significant liaisons with both men and women.

Peter Hujar 
In 1987, when the photographer Peter Hujar died as a victim of the AIDS pandemic, he named Koch as the executor of his entire artistic estate. Since then, Koch has worked to usher Hujar's work out of an esoteric cult following into what he regards as its rightful prominence in twentieth century art. In Harper's Magazine, April 2018, Koch published an essay describing these efforts: "The Pictures".

In 2017, a retrospective of Hujar's work, curated at the Morgan Library in New York, travelled to major venues in Europe and the United States. By then, the critical consensus numbered Hujar among the great American photographers.

Bibliography 
Books:
 Hitler's Pawn: The Boy Assassin and the Holocaust San Francisco, Counterpoint Books. 2019.
 The Breaking Point: Hemingway, Dos Passos, and the Murder of Jose Robles. New York, Counterpoint, 2005. (Paperback 2006; printed in London by Robson Books, 2006). Translations: [Adieu a l’Amitie, Hemingway, Dos Passos et la Guerre d’Espagne. Paris, Editions Grasset et Fasquelle, 2005; La Ruptura: Hemingway, Dos Passos, y el Asesinato de Jose Robles. Barcelona, Galaxia Gutenberg: Circolo des Lectores. 2006.
 Double Lives: Stalin, Willi Münzenberg, and the Seduction of the Intellectuals. New York, Enigma Books, 2004. (Fully revised and updated edition)
 The Modern Library Writer's Workshop. New York, The Modern Library and Random House, 2003.
 The Bachelor's Bride. New York and London, Marion Boyars Inc., 1986. Translations: La Mariée des Célibataires. Paris: Stock, 1988; De Vrijgezellenbruid. Amsterdam: Meulenhoff, 1988; La Novia de los solteros. Barcelona: Editorial Anagrama, 1989.
 Andy Warhol: Photographs. New York, Robert Miller Gallery, 1986.
 Stargazer: Andy Warhol's World and His Films. New York, Praeger, 1986. (Printed in UK by Calder and Boyars, 1974. Second Revised and Expanded USA and UK Edition in 1985 by Marion Boyars. Third USA and UK Edition in 1990, revised with a new introductory chapter). Translations: Hyperstar. Paris: Éditions du Chêne.
 Night Watch. New York, Harper and Row, 1970. (Second printing by Calder and Boyers, 1971. Paperback by Harper and Row, 1973; Trade, 1975). Translations: Les Yeux de la Nuit. Paris: Editions Buchet/Chastel, 1971; Nachtwacke. Amsterdam: Mullenhof, 1973; Guardia Nocturna. Caracas: Monte Avila Editores, 1980.

Essays:
 "Guilt, Grace and Robert Mapplethorpe" (Art in America, November 1986).
 "Caravaggio and the Unseen" (Antaeus, 1986).
 "The Secret Kafka" (The New Criterion, January 1984), translated into French as "Kafka Secret" (L'Infini, Autumn 1985).
 "The Spirit of Soho" (Esquire, April 1975). 
 "The Guilty Sex: Man and Feminism" (Esquire, 1975).

References 

1941 births
Living people
Writers from Saint Paul, Minnesota
University of Minnesota alumni
City College of New York alumni
Columbia University alumni
Stony Brook University faculty
Columbia University faculty
Princeton University faculty